Çubuklu can refer to:

 Çubuklu
 Çubuklu, Erzincan
 Çubuklu, Sur
 Çubuklu, Ulus